The 87th Squadron, Iraqi Air Force is a reconnaissance squadron.

87th Sqn is based at New Al Muthana Air Base and flies the Beechcraft King Air 350ER.

References

87th Squadron IqAF